Gilbertsonia is a fungal genus in the family Fomitopsidaceae. This is a monotypic genus, containing the single brown rot species Gilbertsonia angulipora, found in the United States. Gilbertsonia is characterized by a dimitic hyphal system with clamped generative and well-developed binding hyphae. The generic name honors mycologist Robert Lee Gilbertson (1925 – 2011).

The genus was circumscribed by Erast Parmasto in Harvard Pap. Bot. Vol.6 on page 179 in 2001.

References

Fomitopsidaceae
Fungi of the United States
Monotypic Polyporales genera
Taxa described in 2001